The desert chub (Gila eremica) is a cyprinid fish endemic to  Mexico. It inhabits the headwaters of the Sonora and Matape rivers of northwestern México.

References

Chubs (fish)
Freshwater fish of Mexico
Gila (fish)
Fish described in 1991